Belek is a township in the Serik district in Turkey's Antalya Province. The local population in 2022 is 73,260.

Belek is one of the centers of Turkey's tourism industry and is  home to more than thirty four-star and five-star hotels and many other accommodation services and entertainment facilities.

The town and the surrounding area are famous for their spas and mineral waters received from seven springs.

Belek is a developing golf center. In 2012 it hosted the Turkish Airlines World Golf Final and in 2013 it hosted the Turkish Airlines Open. Belek also hosts the Antalya Open, the only professional tennis tournament currently held in Turkey.

The Kurşunlu Waterfall is a place in Belek which is home to over 100 bird species.  The hidden cave at the back of the waterfall is a popular tourist destination.  The Hellenistic city of Perge is near Belek. Perge is home to the Aspendos amphitheater that can hold over 15,000 spectators.

The ancient Aspendos amphitheater holds 20,000 people, is over 2,000 years old, and still hosts open-air classical ballet and opera festivals today. The Roman ruins at Perge are some of the best preserved archaeological sites in Turkey. Side is one of the best known classical sites in Turkey.

Belek Town
In the center of town the mosque stands alongside statues and a waterfall leading to extensive shopping in the tree lined boulevards. This area is key to Turkey's overall tourism plans having already benefited from substantial investment by the Turkish Tourism Ministry. Turkey is beginning to rival the Algarve for the numbers of golfing tourists annually.

Beaches
With extensive new blue flag beach park facilities "Belek Beach Park", standards of cleanliness are high with  shower, toilet and changing facilities and car parking right on the beach. There are mineral-rich spring water (and sometimes sea water) used to give medicinal baths and the spa resorts offer various health treatments, which are also known as balneotherapy.

Notes

External links

Antalya
Towns in Turkey
Turkish Riviera
Populated places in Antalya Province
Serik District